The Virginia Ratifying Convention (also historically referred to as the "Virginia Federal Convention") was a convention of 168 delegates from Virginia who met in 1788 to ratify or reject the United States Constitution, which had been drafted at the Philadelphia Convention the previous year.

The Convention met and deliberated from June 2 through June 27 in Richmond at the Richmond Theatre, presently the site of Monumental Church. Judge Edmund Pendleton, Virginia delegate to the Constitutional Convention, served as the convention's president by unanimous consent.

Background and composition
The Convention convened "in the temporary capital at Cary and Fourteenth streets" on June 2, 1788, and elected Edmund Pendleton its presiding officer. The next day the Convention relocated to the Richmond Academy (later the site of the Richmond Theatre and now the site of Monumental Church where it continued to meet until June 27.) 

The Virginia Ratifying Convention narrowly approved joining the proposed United States under a Constitution of supreme national law as authorized by "We, the People" of the United States. James Madison led those in favor, Patrick Henry, delegate to the First Continental Convention and Revolutionary wartime governor, led those opposed. Governor Edmund Randolph, who had refused to sign the Constitution in the Philadelphia Convention, chose Virginia's Ratifying Convention to support adoption. George Mason had refused to sign due to the lack of a Bill of Rights in Philadelphia and would continue in his opposition. The Virginia ratification included a recommendation for a Bill of Rights, and Madison subsequently led the First Congress to send the Bill of Rights to the states for ratification.

On receiving the proposed Constitution from the Philadelphia Convention, Congress initiated a ratification procedure for the proposed Constitution which by-passed the sitting state legislatures, going directly to the people of the country, state by state. Four delegates, James Madison with Edmund Randolph for the Federalists and Patrick Henry with George Mason for the Anti-federalists made most of the speeches of the Convention; 149 of the 170 delegates were silent. An early estimate gave the Federalists seeking ratification a slim margin of 86 to Anti-Federalists rejecting at 80, with four unknowns. Federalists came from the Tidewater and Northern Neck, the Shenandoah Valley, and western counties, although the Kentucky counties along the Ohio River feared being abandoned to the Spanish under the new government. The Anti-federalists found strength in the central Piedmont, Southside, and southwest counties.≥

Meeting and debate
Unlike the Philadelphia Constitutional Convention, the Virginia Ratifying Convention was open to the public and crowds filled the galleries along with the press. Delegates changed sides over the debates, demonstrators paraded in the streets, and the press churned out accounts of the proceedings along with commentary pamphlets. The Federalist Papers first became a factor in state ratification conventions outside New York in Virginia. Although a majority of Virginians were said to be against adoption of the Constitution, and the Anti-federalists had the oratorical advantage with Patrick Henry, the Federalists were better organized under the leadership of judges who had been trained by George Wythe, and former Continental Army officers who aligned with George Washington.

Patrick Henry questioned the authority of the Philadelphia Convention to presume to speak for "We, the people" instead of "We, the states". In his view, delegates should have only recommended amendments to the Articles of Confederation. Consolidated government would put an end to Virginia's liberties and state government. Nine states making a new nation without the rest would abrogate treaties and place Virginia in great peril. Edmund Randolph had changed from his opposition in the Philadelphia Convention to now supporting adoption for the sake of preserving the Union. He noted that the Confederation was "totally inadequate" and leading to American downfall. The new Constitution would repair the inadequacies of the Articles. If something were not done, the Union would be lost. The new government should be based on the people who would be governed by it, not the intermediary states. The Constitution should be ratified, along with any "practical" amendments, after the new nation was begun.
 
George Mason countered that a national, consolidated government would overburden Virginians with direct taxes in addition to state taxes, and that government of an extensive territory must necessarily destroy liberty. Although he conceded that the Confederation government was "inefficient", he wanted a clear line between the jurisdictions of the federal and state governments, including the judiciary, because he feared the shared powers would lead to "the destruction of one or the other." Madison pointed out that the history of Confederations like that provided in the Articles of Confederation government were inadequate in the long run, both with the ancients and with the modern (1700s) Germans, Dutch and Swiss. They brought "anarchy and confusion", disharmony and foreign invasion. Efficient government can only come from direct operation on individuals, it can never flow from negotiations among a confederation's constituent states. The proposed Constitution creates a republic with each branch of government grounded in the people without hereditary offices. Its mixed nature was both federated and consolidated, but in all cases was based on "the superior power of the people". The states would remain important because the House of Representatives were chosen by people in each state, and the Senate was chosen by the state legislatures. The Constitution limited the national government to enumerated powers.

The Virginia Ratification (Federal) Convention made a final vote on George Wythe's motion to ratify, passing it 89 to 79. Virginians reserved the right to withdraw from the new government. The remedy for federal “injury or oppression” included amending the Constitution. Unlike the Pennsylvania Convention where the Federalists railroaded the Anti-federalists in an all or nothing choice, in the Virginia Convention the Federalists had made efforts to reconcile with the Anti-federalists by recommending amendments like that of Virginia's Bill of Rights preamble to its 1776 Constitution. The American experiment was imagined to become one of successive constitutional changes to meet changing circumstances.

Outcomes

Virginia was the tenth state to ratify the new Constitution. New York followed a month later on July 26, 1788. The new government began operating with eleven states on March 4, 1789.

The convention recommended the addition of a bill of rights, but did not make ratification contingent upon it.

Many of the ideas presented during this convention were later incorporated into the United States Bill of Rights. James Madison, elected to Congress from his home district was a floor leader in the first session of the First Congress. Madison rewrote the various state proposals into twelve proposals from Congress as amended, sent to the States for ratification by three-fourths of them.

Patrick Henry's hostility to the government under the Constitution was so strong that he subsequently refused to join it, turning down offers to serve as United States Secretary of State and as a justice of the United States Supreme Court. His control of the Virginia legislature enabled his partisans to elect the only two Anti-Federalist U.S. Senators in the First Congress.

List of delegates and votes on ratification
The following list is of the delegates to the Virginia ratifying convention and their vote on ratification. A total of 170 delegates were elected. Of these, 168 voted on ratification: 89 for, 79 against. The delegates included representatives from modern-day Kentucky and West Virginia, which were part of Virginia at the time.

See also
 Virginia Conventions

Footnotes

References
Labunski, Richard E. James Madison and the Struggle for the Bill of Rights. New York: Oxford University Press, 2006.
Elliot, Jonathan. The Debates in the Several State Conventions on the Adoption of the Federal Constitution..., vol. 3. Philadelphia: Lippincott, 1891.

Further reading
  At Google Books. (Also DaCapo Press single-volume edition of 1969 Contains records of resolutions and individual votes at the ratification convention and short biographical sketches of five future U.S. office holders J. Marshall, J. Madison, J. Monroe, John Tyler, B. Harrison. Five famous "old men of the Convention" are outlined, P. Henry, G. Mason, G. Wythe, E. Randolph, Henry Lee and E. Pendleton, as well as lesser-knowns.
 Maier, Pauline. Ratification: The People Debate the Constitution, 1787-1788 (2010) pp 235–319; the standard scholarly study
Shepard, E. Lee, comp. Reluctant Ratifiers: Virginia Considers the Federal Constitution. Richmond: Virginia Historical Society, 1988. .
Thomas, Robert E. "The Virginia Convention of 1788: A Criticism of Beard's An Economic Interpretation of the Constitution", The Journal of Southern History 19, no. 1 (Feb., 1953), pp. 63–72.

Primary sources

External links
"Patrick Henry, Virginia Ratifying Convention, 5-16 June 1788"
"George Mason and the Constitution"
Text of the debates
Text of the ratification
Debates and other proceedings of the Convention of Virginia … 1788 Hunter and Prentis, Petersburg, ebook free online.

1788 in the United States
1788 in Virginia
Political history of Virginia
Ratification of the United States Constitution
1788 in American politics